Paul-Arthur Séguin (October 2, 1875 – November 24, 1946) was a Canadian notary and political figure in Quebec. He represented L'Assomption and then L'Assomption—Montcalm in the House of Commons of Canada from 1908 to 1935 as a Liberal.

He was born in Charlemagne, Quebec, the son of Felix Séguin and Vitaline Noiseux, and was educated at the Collège de L'Assomption and the Université Laval. In 1899, he married Marie Anna Rivest. Séguin was secretary-treasurer for Terrebonne from 1900 to 1907 and was also mayor of L'Assomption.

References

External links 
 Paul-Arthur Séguin, L’Encyclopédie de l’histoire du Québec / The Quebec History Encyclopedia, Marianopolis College 

Members of the House of Commons of Canada from Quebec
Liberal Party of Canada MPs
Mayors of places in Quebec
1848 births
1905 deaths
People from Charlemagne, Quebec